Georges Claes (7 January 1920, Boutersem - 14 March 1994) was a Belgian racing cyclist. He won Paris–Roubaix in 1946 and 1947. He finished in third place in the 1948 Paris–Roubaix.

References

External links
 Cycling hall of fame

1920 births
1994 deaths
People from Boutersem
Belgian male cyclists
Cyclists from Flemish Brabant
20th-century Belgian people